The Timoric languages are a group of Austronesian languages (belonging to the Central–Eastern subgroup) spoken on the islands of Timor, neighboring Wetar, and (depending on the classification) Southwest Maluku to the east.

Within the group, the languages with the most speakers are Uab Meto of West Timor, Indonesia and Tetum of East Timor, each with about half a million speakers, though in addition Tetum is an official language and a lingua franca among non-Tetum East Timorese.

Languages

Hull (1998) & van Engelenhoven (2009)
Geoffrey Hull (1998) proposes a Timoric group as follows:

Timoric A ("Extra-Ramelaic", Fabronic; whatever is not Ramelaic)
West: Dawan (Uab Meto)–Amarasi, Helong, Roti (Bilba, Dengka, Lole, Ringgou, Dela-Oenale, Termanu, Tii)
Central: Tetun, Bekais, Habu
North: Wetar, Galoli
East: Kairui, Waimaha, Midiki, Naueti
Timoric B ("Ramelaic", near the Ramelau range)
West: Kemak, Tukudede
Central: Mambai
East (Idalaka): Idaté, Isní, Lakalei, Lolein

Van Engelenhoven (2009) accepts Hull's classification, but further includes Makuva and the Luangic–Kisaric languages (Kisar, Romang, Luang, Wetan, Leti) in the Eastern branch of Timoric A.

Taber (1993)

In a lexicostatistical classification of the languages of Southwest Maluku, Taber (1993:396) posits a "Southwest Maluku" branch of the Timoric languages, that comprises all languages of the area, except for West Damar and the Babar languages.

Timoric
(other branches on Timor)
Southwest Maluku
East Damar
Wetar: Talur, Wetar cluster (Aputai, Perai, Tugun, Iliun)
Kisar-Roma: Kisar, Roma
Luang: Leti, Luang, Wetan
TNS (Teun-Nila-Serua): Teun, Nila-Serua (Nila, Serua)
(other branches of CMP, including Babar languages and West Damar)

Edwards (2018, 2019)

Edwards (2018, 2019) divides the languages of Timor and Southwest Maluku into three branches:

Helong
Central Timor: Kemak, Tokodede, Mambae, Welaun
"Timor-Wetar-Babar"

The latter subgroup includes all other languages grouped by Hull as Timoric, as well all languages of Southwest Maluku (including the Babar languages). Within "Timor-Wetar-Babar", Edwards proposes a Rote-Meto branch, with languages spoken on Rote Island and in West Timor.

Rote-Meto
West Rote-Meto
Dela, Oenale
Dengka-Meto
Dengka, Lelain
Meto
Nuclear Rote
Tii, Lole
Termanu, Ba'a, Korbafo, Bokai, Talae, Keka
Bilbaa, Diu, Lelenuk
Rikou, Landu, Oepao

References

 Hull, Geoffrey. 1998. "The basic lexical affinities of Timor's Austronesian languages: a preliminary investigation." Studies in Languages and Cultures of East Timor 1:97–202.
 Taber, Mark (1993). "Toward a Better Understanding of the Indigenous Languages of Southwestern Maluku." Oceanic Linguistics, Vol. 32, No. 2 (Winter, 1993), pp. 389–441. University of Hawai'i.

External links
LexiRumah (part of the Lesser Sunda linguistic databases)
Reconstructing the past through languages of the present: the Lesser Sunda Islands
The Languages of East Timor: Some Basic Facts (Revised 24.8.2004) Geoffrey Hull

Languages of Indonesia
Languages of East Timor